Sergey Vasilyevich Matveyev (born 25 April 1972) is a Russian football coach and a former player.

Playing career
He made his professional debut in the 1994 Russian Third League for FC Mashinostroitel Sergiyev Posad.

Coaching career
Before the 2019–20 season, he was hired by FC Krasnodar as head coach. He left the club in June 2020.

References

External links
 Profile by Russian Premier League
 Profile by official site FC Krasnodar

1972 births
Living people
Russian footballers
FC Neftekhimik Nizhnekamsk players
FC Saturn Ramenskoye players
Russian football managers
Association football midfielders
FC Krasnodar managers
FC Sportakademklub Moscow players